Una Voz Para tu Corazón – 30 Grandes Éxitos (English A voice for your heart-30 Greatest Hits) is a compilation album by the Mexican pop singer, Ana Gabriel.

Track listing

Cd 1
 Simplemente amigos
 Y aquí estoy
 Es el amor quien llega
 Ay amor
 Destino
 Pensar en ti
 Mar y arena
 No a perdón
 Tú y yo
 Evidencias
 Ven, ven
 Pecado original
 Amor
 Soledad
 Hice bien quererte

Cd 2
 No te hago falta
 Eres differente
 Amor con desamor
 Cosas del amor
 Que poco hombre
 Ni un roce
 Llena de romance
 En la oscuridad
 Luna
 Poquita fe
 Esta noche
 Quién como tú
 A tu lado
 Lo sé
 Obsesión

Album charts

 Note: This release reached the #15 position in Billboard Regional Mexican Albums staying for 1 week  and it reached the #31 position in the Billboard Top Latin Albums staying for 5 weeks in the chart.

References

Ana Gabriel compilation albums
2000 greatest hits albums